Retizhe Cove (‘Zaliv Retizhe’ \'za-liv re-ti-'zhe\) is the 5.8 km wide cove indenting for 6.2 km on the south coast of Trinity Peninsula in Graham Land, Antarctica.  Part of Duse Bay, entered between Boil Point to the west and Garvan Point to the east.

The cove is named after the Retizhe River in Pirin Mountain, Southwestern Bulgaria.

Location
German-British mapping in 1996.

Maps
 Trinity Peninsula. Scale 1:250000 topographic map No. 5697. Institut für Angewandte Geodäsie and British Antarctic Survey, 1996.
 Antarctic Digital Database (ADD). Scale 1:250000 topographic map of Antarctica. Scientific Committee on Antarctic Research (SCAR). Since 1993, regularly updated.

References
 Retizhe Cove. SCAR Composite Antarctic Gazetteer
 Bulgarian Antarctic Gazetteer. Antarctic Place-names Commission. (details in Bulgarian, basic data in English)

External links
 Retizhe Cove. Copernix satellite image

Coves of Graham Land
Landforms of Trinity Peninsula
Bulgaria and the Antarctic